Masafu is a town in the Eastern Region of Uganda.

Location
The coordinates of Masafu are 0°24'43.0"N, 34°02'07.0"E (Latitude:0.411936; Longitude:34.0352810).

Points of interest
The following points of interest lie within the town limits or close to the edges of town:

 Masafu General Hospital, a government-owned public hospital, with planned bed capacity of 100.
 Musita–Mayuge–Lumino–Majanji–Busia Road, a national road, under upgrade to class II bitumen surface, with completion expected in August 2017.

See also
Busia District
List of hospitals in Uganda

References

Busia District, Uganda
Populated places in Eastern Region, Uganda